Jai Jagat 2020 is an international campaign for justice and peace initiated by Rajagopal P. V. and Jill Carr-Harris. The main action is a march from Rajghat, New Delhi, to the United Nations headquarters in Geneva, Switzerland. It started on October 2, 2019, on the 150th anniversary of Mahatma Gandhi. Around 50 people from at least 10 countries are walking 10,000 km during one year. It will arrive in Geneva on October 2, 2020. The march will cross 10 countries: India, Iran, Armenia, Georgia, Bulgaria, Serbia, Bosnia and Herzegovina, Croatia, Italy, and Switzerland. In addition, a small delegation is going to Pakistan.

The objectives are based on the Sustainable Development Goals of the United Nations, especially eradication of poverty, reduction of discrimination, fight against climate change, and nonviolent conflict resolution.

In India, the march reached Sevagram, in Maharashtra, where it arrived on January 30, 2020, after crossing Delhi, Haryana, Uttar Pradesh, Madhya Pradesh.

The march was stopped in Armenia on March 15, 2020, because of the COVID-19 pandemic. Several marches from Belgium, Sweden, Germany, France, and Spain were planned to converge to Geneva, but only small marches from France actually happened.

Gallery 
A few images of Jai Jagat in India

References

External links 
 Jai Jagat 2020 official website

Sustainable development
Movements in Asia